Hans-Gunnar Liljenwall (born 9 July 1941) is a former Swedish modern pentathlete who caused the disqualification of the Swedish team at the 1968 Summer Olympics for alcohol use.

Career
Liljenwall was the first athlete to be disqualified at the Olympics for drug use, following the introduction of anti-doping regulations by the International Olympic Committee in 1967. Liljenwall reportedly had "two beers" to calm his nerves before the pistol shooting event. The Swedish team eventually had to return their bronze medals.

Alcohol was not on the list of restricted substances released by the International Olympic Committee for the 1968 Summer Olympics.

Liljenwall also participated in the 1964 and 1972 Olympics. In 1964 he finished 11th individually and fourth with the team, and in 1972 he placed 25th and fifth, respectively.

See also
List of sportspeople sanctioned for doping offences

References 

1941 births
Living people
Swedish male modern pentathletes
Swedish sportspeople in doping cases
Olympic modern pentathletes of Sweden
Modern pentathletes at the 1964 Summer Olympics
Modern pentathletes at the 1968 Summer Olympics
Modern pentathletes at the 1972 Summer Olympics
Competitors stripped of Summer Olympics medals
World Modern Pentathlon Championships medalists
Doping cases in modern pentathlon
Sportspeople from Jönköping